The 2017–18 Ukrainian Basketball SuperLeague was the 2017–18 edition of the Ukrainian top-tier basketball championship. The season started on 29 September 2017. Cherkaski Mavpy won its first national championship after defeating Dnipro in the finals, 0–3.

Teams

After the withdrawal of Kremin and Volynbasket, only eight teams would participate in the 2017–18 season.

Regular season

Playoffs
Quarterfinals were played in a best-of-three playoff format. Semifinals were played with a 2-2-1 format and the finals with a 2-2-1-1-1 format.

Individual awards
Most Valuable Player

Ukrainian clubs in European competitions

References

External links
Official Superleague website

Ukrainian Basketball SuperLeague seasons
1
Ukraine